= Katherine Yanhang Zhang =

Chinese-American biomechanical engineer

Katherine Yanhang Zhang is a Chinese and American biomechanical engineer whose research investigates the biomechanics of the cardiovascular system. She works at Boston University as a professor of mechanical engineering, biomedical engineering, and materials science & engineering, and director of the Center for Multiscale & Translational Mechanobiology.

== Education and career ==
Zhang received a bachelor's degree in engineering mechanics from Tsinghua University in 1998. She completed her Ph.D. in mechanical engineering 2003 at the University of Colorado Boulder.

She continued at CU Boulder as a research associate until 2005, and in 2006 joined Boston University as a Clare Boothe Luce Assistant Professor of mechanical engineering, biomedical engineering, and materials science & engineering. She was promoted to associate professor in 2012 and full professor in 2019.

== Recognition ==
Zhang received a National Science Foundation CAREER Award in 2010. In 2018, the American Society of Mechanical Engineers elected her as an ASME Fellow. She was elected to the College of Fellows of the American Institute for Medical and Biological Engineering in 2021.
